DXP reductoisomerase (1-deoxy-D-xylulose 5-phosphate reductoisomerase or DXR) is an enzyme that interconverts 1-deoxy-D-xylulose 5-phosphate (DXP) and 2-C-methyl-D-erythritol 4-phosphate (MEP).

It is classified under . It is normally abbreviated DXR, but it is sometimes named IspC, as the product of the ispC gene.

DXR is part of the MEP pathway (nonmevalonate pathway) of isoprenoid precursor biosynthesis. DXR is inhibited by fosmidomycin.

This enzyme is required for terpenoid biosynthesis in some organisms, since it is a key enzyme on the MEP pathway for the production of the isoprenoid precursors IPP and DMAPP. In Arabidopsis thaliana 1-deoxy-D-xylulose 5-phosphate reductoisomerase is the first committed enzyme of the MEP pathway for isoprenoid precursor biosynthesis. The enzyme requires Mn2+, Co2+ or Mg2+ for activity, with Mn2+ being most effective.

References

External links
 

Protein families
EC 1.1.1